Lynbrook refers to multiple locations:

Lynbrook, New York is a village in Nassau County, New York, United States
Lynbrook, Victoria is a suburb of Melbourne, Australia
Lynbrook High School is a high school in San Jose, California, United States